Retinography is imaging of the retina and may refer to:
 Retinal scan, a biometric technique to identify people
 Ophthalmoscopy, diagnostic examination of the retina and other structures in the fundus of the eye